The First Cabinet of Kim Kielsen was a former administration of Greenland. It was appointed on 10 December 2014 with Kim Kielsen from Forward (Siumut) as Prime Minister, leading a coalition between Forward (Siumut), Democrats (Demokraatit) and Solidarity (Atassut). It was a majority government, composed of both right-wing and left-wing members. It was replaced by the Kielsen II Cabinet on 2 February 2016.

List of ministers 
The Social Democratic Siumut has 5 ministers including the Prime Minister. The Social liberal Democrats has 2 ministers. The Liberalistic Solidarity has 2 ministers.

Party breakdown 
Party breakdown of cabinet ministers:

See also 
Cabinet of Greenland

References

Government of Greenland
Coalition governments
Politics of Greenland
Political organisations based in Greenland
Kielsen, Kim 1
2014 establishments in Greenland
Kielsen
2014 in Greenland
Greenland politics-related lists